Eleftheria Arvanitaki - Live apo to Gyalino Mousiko Theatro is a live album by the Greek popular artist Eleftheria Arvanitaki that was released in 2002 by Universal Music Greece. It was recorded at Gyalino Mousiko Theatro in 2001. It sold over 20,000 copies in Greece and was certified Gold.

Track listing 
"Omorfi Mou Agapi"
"Telos" (Ola Arhizoun Edo)
"Na Me Thymasai"
"Tha Kleiso Ta Matia"
"Stalia Stalia"
"Thelo Konta Sou Na Meino"
"To Parapono"
"Parapono - I Ksenitia"
"Efyges Noris"
"Pes Mou Mia Lexi"
"To Miden"

Eleftheria Arvanitaki live albums
Greek-language albums
2002 live albums
Universal Music Greece live albums
Mercury Records live albums